John Foster also known as Jon Jon Foster is an English-singer best known for his time as part of Bronski Beat with Larry Steinbachek and Steve Bronski.

Early life
Foster was born in Basildon in Essex, England on the 26th February 1961. He spent most of his younger years at clubs and pubs around Essex and London where in 1978. He met Depeche Mode lead singer, Dave Gahan and Yazoo lead singer, Alison Moyet at a club. He later met Larry Steinbachek at a gay bar and was invited to join Bronski Beat after Jimmy Somerville left.

Career
Following the departure of Jimmy Somerville in 1985, Foster joined the band and he co-wrote the songs, "Hit That Perfect Beat"and "C'mon! C'mon!". The bands popularity began to partly dwindle following the release of Cmon! Cmon! and around that time, Foster decided to leave the band and pursued a single career with a new band called "Us". He was replaced by Jonathan Hellyer as the lead singer of Bronski Beat before he also left the band. 

Foster returned briefly to the band from 1994 before leaving for good in 1995. Jonathan Hellyer briefly returned to the band after Fosters departure but Bronski Beat disbanded in 1995. He has since worked on single material with his most recent songs being with independent musician, MetalMatt and his songs which Foster has collaborated on include Future and Mexico. Foster also continues to record and work as a singer and songwriter.

Personal life
Foster is also openly gay and he was close friends with Larry Steinbachek and Steve Bronski before both died in 2017 and 2021 respectively.

References

1961 births
20th-century British LGBT people
20th-century English male singers
21st-century LGBT people
21st-century English male singers
british synth-pop new wave musicians
Bronski Beat members
Gay singers
English LGBT singers
People from Basildon
English new wave musicians
English gay musicians